This is a list of Disney attractions that have used Audio-Animatronics.

Disneyland Resort

Disneyland 
 Main Street, U.S.A.
 Disneyland Railroad
 Primeval World
 Great Moments with Mr. Lincoln
 Adventureland
 Walt Disney's Enchanted Tiki Room
 Indiana Jones Adventure: Temple of the Forbidden Eye
 Jungle Cruise
 New Orleans Square
 The Haunted Mansion
 Pirates of the Caribbean
 Frontierland
 Mark Twain Riverboat 
 Sailing Ship Columbia
 Big Thunder Mountain Railroad
 Mine Train Through Nature's Wonderland (since removed)
Entertainment
 Fantasmic!
 Critter Country
 Splash Mountain
 Tiana's Bayou Adventure (Opening in June 30, 2024)
 The Many Adventures of Winnie the Pooh
 Country Bear Jamboree (since removed)
Fantasyland
 It's a Small World
 Matterhorn Bobsleds
 Alice in Wonderland
 Pinocchio's Daring Journey
 Snow White's Enchanted Wish
 Peter Pan's Flight
 Mickey's Toontown
 Mickey & Minnie's Runaway Railway 
 Roger Rabbit's Car Toon Spin
 Tomorrowland
 Star Tours (since removed)
 Star Tours – The Adventures Continue
 Buzz Lightyear Astro Blasters
 Finding Nemo Submarine Voyage
 Submarine Voyage (since removed)
 Innoventions (since removed)
 America Sings (since removed)
 Flight to the Moon (since removed)
 Mission to Mars (since removed)
 Carousel of Progress (since moved to Walt Disney World's Magic Kingdom)
 Muppet Mobile Lab
 Star Wars: Galaxy's Edge
 Millennium Falcon: Smugglers Run
 Star Wars: Rise of the Resistance 
Parades
Walt Disney's Parade of Dreams (since removed)

Disney California Adventure 
A Bug's Land (since removed)
It's Tough to Be a Bug! (since removed)
Avengers Campus 
 Guardians of the Galaxy - Mission: Breakout!
 Web Slingers: A Spider-Man Adventure
Cars Land
Radiator Springs Racers
Hollywood Land
 Disney Junior – Live on Stage! (since removed)
 Muppet*Vision 3D (since removed)
 Mickey's PhilharMagic
 Monsters, Inc. Mike & Sulley to the Rescue! 
 Superstar Limo (since removed)
 Lucky the Dinosaur (temporary 'walk-around' animatronic)
 Muppet Mobile Lab (temporary 'walk-around' animatronic)
Pixar Pier
Toy Story Midway Mania!
Paradise Gardens Park
The Little Mermaid: Ariel's Undersea Adventure

Walt Disney World Resort

The Magic Kingdom 
 Adventureland
 Walt Disney's Enchanted Tiki Room
 The Enchanted Tiki Room (Under New Management) (since removed)
 Jungle Cruise
 Pirates of the Caribbean
 Liberty Square
 The Hall of Presidents
 The Haunted Mansion
 Liberty Belle Riverboat
 Frontierland
 Big Thunder Mountain Railroad
 Tiana's Bayou Adventure (Opening in 2024)
 Splash Mountain (since removed)
 Country Bear Jamboree
 Fantasyland
It's a Small World
Mr. Toad's Wild Ride (since removed)
Mickey's PhilharMagic
Mickey Mouse Revue (since moved to Tokyo Disneyland)
Peter Pan's Flight
Snow White's Adventures (since removed)
Snow White's Scary Adventures (since removed)
20,000 Leagues Under the Sea: Submarine Voyage (since removed)
Under the Sea: Journey of the Little Mermaid
The Many Adventures of Winnie the Pooh
The Barnstormer
Enchanted Tales with Belle
Seven Dwarfs Mine Train
 Tomorrowland
The Carousel of Progress
 Stitch's Great Escape! (since removed)
 Buzz Lightyear's Space Rangers Spin 
 Sonny Eclipse and the Amazing Astro Organ at Cosmic Ray's Starlight Café 
 Flight to the Moon (since removed)
 Mission to Mars (since removed)
 The Timekeeper (since removed)
 ExtraTERRORestrial Alien Encounter (since removed)

Epcot 
Future World (since removed)
 Innoventions (animatronics since removed)
 Universe of Energy (since removed)
Ellen's Energy Adventure (since removed)
 Wonders of Life (standing but not operating)
Cranium Command (since removed)
 Horizons (since removed)
World of Motion (since removed)
World Celebration
 Spaceship Earth: Our Shared Story
 Imagination!
 Journey Into Imagination with Figment
World Nature
 The Seas with Nemo and Friends
 The Land
 Living with the Land
World Showcase
 The American Adventure
 Medieval Diorama at the Sportsman's Shoppe
 Frozen Ever After 
 Maelstrom (since removed)
 Remy's Ratatouille Adventure 
 Chef Remy at Les Chefs de France (temporary 'walk-around' animatronic)
 Gran Fiesta Tour Starring The Three Caballeros
 El Rio del Tiempo (since rethemed to feature The Three Caballeros)
Entertainment
 Muppet Mobile Lab

Disney's Hollywood Studios 
Grand Avenue
Muppet*Vision 3D
Hollywood Boulevard
Mickey and Minnie's Runaway Railway 
The Great Movie Ride (since removed)
Echo Lake
Star Tours (since removed)
Star Tours - The Adventures Continue
Animation Courtyard
Disney Junior – Live on Stage! (since removed)
Sunset Boulevard
 Lightning McQueen's Racing Academy
Star Wars: Galaxy's Edge
 Millennium Falcon: Smugglers Run
 Star Wars: Rise of the Resistance
Toy Story Land
Toy Story Midway Mania! (Mr. Potato Head removed until Toy Story Land opening in 2018)
Slinky Dog Dash (Wheezy Animatronic)

Disney Springs
 World of Disney (REMOVED in Remodel of Store)

Disney's Animal Kingdom 
Discovery Island
It's Tough to Be a Bug!
DinoLand U.S.A.
Dinosaur 
 Lucky the Dinosaur (since ended)
Asia
Expedition Everest
Pandora – The World of Avatar
Avatar Flight of Passage
Na'vi River Journey

Tokyo Disney Resort

Tokyo Disneyland 
 Adventureland
 Primeval World diorama (as part of Western River Railroad)
 Jungle Cruise
 The Enchanted Tiki Room: Stitch Presents Aloha e Komo Mai!
 The Enchanted Tiki Room: Now Playing Get the Fever! (since removed)
 Walt Disney's Enchanted Tiki Room (since removed)
 Pirates of the Caribbean
 Critter Country
 Splash Mountain
 Westernland
 Country Bear Theater
Big Thunder Mountain
 Mark Twain Riverboat
 Big Thunder Mountain Railroad
 Fantasyland
 Enchanted Tale of Beauty and the Beast 
 It's a Small World
 Mickey's PhilharMagic
 Mickey Mouse Revue (since removed)
 Haunted Mansion
 Pinocchio's Daring Journey 
 Pooh's Hunny Hunt
 Peter Pan's Flight
 Snow White's Adventures
 Cinderella's Fairy Tale Hall
ToonTown
Mickey's House and Meet Mickey
Roger Rabbit's Car Toon Spin
 Tomorrowland
 Star Tours (since removed)
 Star Tours – The Adventures Continue 
 Buzz Lightyear's Astro Blasters
 Monsters, Inc. Ride & Go Seek

Tokyo DisneySea 
 Mediterranean Harbor
 Soaring: Fantastic Flight
 Arabian Coast
Sinbad's Storybook Voyage 
Magic Lamp Theater
Port Discovery
Nemo & Friends SeaRider
StormRider (since removed)
Mermaid Lagoon
Mermaid Lagoon Theater
American Waterfront
Tower of Terror
Toy Story Mania!
Arendelle: World of Frozen
Frozen Ever After
Lost River Delta
Indiana Jones Adventure: Temple of the Crystal Skull
 Mysterious Island
Journey to the Center of the Earth
20,000 Leagues Under the Sea
 Entertainment
Fantasmic! (nighttime show since removed)

Disneyland Paris

Disneyland Park 
 Frontierland
 Phantom Manor
 Big Thunder Mountain Railroad
 Thunder Mesa Riverboats
 Adventureland
 Le Passage Enchanté d'Aladdin
 Pirates of the Caribbean
 Colonel Hathi's Pizza Outpost
 Fantasyland
 Le Château de la Belle au Bois Dormant
 It's a Small World
 Les Voyages de Pinocchio
 Blanche Neige et les Sept Nains
 Discoveryland
 Le Visionarium (since removed)
 Les Mystères du Nautilus
 Star Tours (since removed)
 Star Tours - L'Aventure Continue
 Buzz Lightyear Laser Blast

Walt Disney Studios Park 
 Worlds of Pixar
 Crush's Coaster
 Ratatouille: L'Aventure Totalement Toquée de Rémy
 Production Courtyard
 Disney Junior - Live on Stage! (since removed)
 Arendelle: World of Frozen
 Frozen Ever After (TBC)
 Avengers Campus 
 Avengers Assemble: Flight Force
 Web Slingers: A Spider-Man Adventure
 Star Wars: Galaxy's Edge (TBC)
 Star Wars: Rise of the Resistance (TBC)

Hong Kong Disneyland Resort

Hong Kong Disneyland 
 Main Street, U.S.A.
 Hong Kong Disneyland Railroad
 Adventureland
 Jungle River Cruise
 Festival of the Lion King
 Tarzan's Treehouse on Tarzan Island
 Fantasyland
 It's a Small World
 Mickey's PhilharMagic
 The Many Adventures of Winnie the Pooh
 Tomorrowland
 Buzz Lightyear Astro Blasters (since removed)
 Grizzly Gulch
 Big Grizzly Mountain Runaway Mine Cars
 Mystic Point
 Mystic Manor
 Arendelle: World of Frozen
 Frozen Ever After (2021)
 Stark Expo (2023)
 Ant-Man and The Wasp: Nano Battle!
 Iron Man Experience (2016)
 Parades
 Mickey's WaterWorks (since removed)
 Glow in the Park Halloween Parade (since removed)
 Flights of Fantasy Parade
 Entertainment
 Muppet Mobile Lab (since removed)

Shanghai Disneyland

Shanghai Disneyland 
 Tomorrowland
 Buzz Lightyear Planet Rescue
 Fantasyland
 Seven Dwarfs Mine Train
 The Many Adventures of Winnie the Pooh
 Peter Pan's Flight
 Treasure Cove
 Pirates of the Caribbean - Battle for the Sunken Treasure
 Adventure Isle
 Roaring Rapids (Disney)
 Soaring Over the Horizon

References

Lists of Disney attractions
Disney technology
Entertainment robots
Audio-Animatronics